Grand Ayatollah  Sayyid Ali Asghar Dastgheib  (born 1945) is an Iranian Twelver Shia Marja and member of the Iranian Assembly of Experts. He was among those who advised Ruhollah Khomeini in probate matters.

Biography 
He was born in December 1945 in Shiraz, Iran. He is the son of Ali Akbar Dastgheib and grandson of Ayatollah Hidayatullah Shirazi. He graduated from Shahpur Shiraz seminary and for higher education went to Qom Seminary. In Qom he studied in seminars of Grand Ayatollah Mirza Hashem Amoli and Grand Ayatollah Golpayegani.

Career 
In 2013, Asghar became a trustee of the shrine of Shah Cheragh and Muhammad ibn Musa ibn Ja'far in Shiraz by Ali Khamenei.

He also became boss of the Board of Trustees Council in Shiraz .

See also 

 List of current Maraji
 List of members in the First Term of the Council of Experts

References

External links

Iranian grand ayatollahs
Living people
Members of the Assembly of Experts
1945 births
Qom Seminary alumni